Eisregen is a German death metal/black metal band formed in 1995. The members are from Tambach-Dietharz, a village in Thuringia.

History 
In English, Eisregen translates to "ice rain". By using morbid German lyrics unlike those of other bands of this genre, Eisregen got the attention of German authorities, causing the ban by the Federal Department for Media Harmful to Young Persons of three of their albums in Germany.

Eisregen originally planned to disband after releasing a final album called Menschenmaterial ("human resources", as in mineral/natural resources, a dehumanizing reference to "spendable" humans), but announced that they will continue to work together.

Musical style 
Eisregen's old albums were more black metal-influenced than the newer ones. The violin parts, now typical for the band, came with 1998's Krebskolonie ("cancer colony"), considered the band's best album by many of their fans.

Censorship 
Unlike regular banning (referred to as "indexing"), which prohibits playing the songs in public, selling to minors and any kind of advertisement, Krebskolonie is not allowed to be sold at all in Germany. The reason given by the Federal Department for Media Harmful to Young Persons were the lyrics, which were described as cruel, inhuman, misogynistic and brutalising. The band could not fight the ban as their label Last Episode (which they left afterwards) did not inform them.

Interviews show the reasons giving for the ban differ from lyricist Michael Roth's intentions. As an example, an excerpt from the ban report referring to the song "Futter für die Schweine" ("food for the pigs"):

 "Dieses Lied weist daneben auch Bezüge zur Frauenfeindlichkeit auf. So ist der Sänger der Meinung, dass das Leben einer Prostituierten so gering zu schätzen sei, dass sie nur als Schweinefutter tauge" (translates to: "This song also contains misogynistic references. In the singer's opinion, a prostitute's life has so little value that she is only fit to be pig food.")

Roth himself stated:

 "Die Menschheit nimmt sich prinzipiell immer viel zu wichtig und stellt sich eben immer an die Spitze der Nahrungskette […]. Es war einfach ganz interessant, daß man mal ein Wesen darüberstellt. Den Mensch eben auch mal zum Futter degradiert […]. Das Thema hab ich auch wieder bei 'Futter für die Schweine' aufgegriffen, daß sich die Nahrungskette eben mal anders darstellt, als sie gemeinhin aufgefaßt wird. Die Geschichte ist aus einer ziemlich kranken und zynischen Sicht geschrieben." (translates to: "Mankind normally takes itself far too serious and sees itself as the top of the food chain [...]. It was interesting to put another creature there [...]. I used that topic for 'Futter für die Schweine' and showed the food chain in different way than it is generally seen. The story is told from a quite sick and cynical view.")

The ban of the 2001 album Farbenfinsternis ("color darkness"), which along with Krebskolonie was one of their most important releases, inflicted financial damages to Eisregen. The album Menschenmaterial, originally thought to be their sixth and last album, was not released. The band announced to release one more album called Blutbahnen ("bloodlines") before, as they found new motivation to make music.

On 1 February 2007, their release Wundwasser ("water from wounds") was banned due to "youth endangering and condemnable contents".

In order to circumvent the banning rules, Eisregen retitle songs when playing them live. "Meine tote Russische Freundin" and "Futter für die Schweine" became "Meine schwedische Freundin" and "Nonnen für die Schweine". "Krebskolonie" is often played as "Leprakolonie" ("leper colony").

Reception 
Although Eisregen were criticized for their horror and splatter lyrics, their songs also have a certain (often morbid and humorous) background and sometimes even deal with social or historical topics (e.g. "Schwarze Rose", "vom Muttermord", "Ripper von Rostow", "Eisenkreuzkrieger", "17 Kerzen am Dom") in a fictional way.

Band members 

Current
 Michael "Blutkehle" Roth – vocals
 Michael "Bursche" Lenz – guitars, bass
 Franzi "Dr. Franzenstein" – keyboard
 Ronny "Yantit" Fimmel – drums, electronics

Former
 K. Matthes – bass (1997–1998)
 Michael "Der Hölzer" Brill – bass (1999–2000)
 Sebastian "Berg" Morbach – bass (1996–1997, 2000–2005)
 Theresa "2T" Trenks – violin (1997–2006)
 Daniel "DF" Fröbing – keyboard (1995–1999 and 2007)
 Birgit Lages – bass (2005–2006)
 Jan-Vincent Simmen on Demo '95

Discography 
 Promo 96 (demo, 1996)
 Das Ende des Weges (The End of the Path) demo (1996) (limited to 333 copies)
 Fleischhaus (Butcher's Hall,  House of Flesh) (vinyl, 1997) (limited to 1,000 copies)
 Zerfall (Decay) (1998)
 Krebskolonie (Cancer Colony) (1998)
 Leichenlager (Morgue, lit. Corpse Store) (2000)
 Fleischfestival (Festival of Flesh) (EP, 2000)
 Farbenfinsternis (Darkened Colours, lit. Colour Darkness) (2001)
 Lager Leipzig (Camp Leipzig) video (2001)
 Zerfall re-release (2004) (bonus: Das Ende des Weges demo) (remastered)
 Wundwasser (lit. Wound Water) (2004)
 Hexenhaus (Witch's Cottage) (EP + DVD, 2005)
 Blutbahnen (Blood Trails) (2007)
 Eine Erhalten (Give It to Me, lit. Receive One) (EP, 2007)
 Knochenkult (Bone Cult) (2008)
 Bühnenblut (Stage Blood) (live CD, 2009)
 Schlangensonne (lit. Snake Sun) (2010)
 Madenreich – Ein Stück Rostrot (Kingdom of Maggots – A Little Rust-red) (EP, 2011)
 Rostrot (Rust-red) (2011)
 Krebskollektion (Cancer Collection) (compilation, 2012)
 Todestage (Dates of Death) (2013)
 Flötenfreunde (Friends of Flutes) (EP, 2014)
 Brummbär (Brummbär) (EP, 2015)
 Marschmusik (March Music) (2015)
 Fleischfilm (Meat Movie) (2017)
 Satan liebt dich (Satan Loves You) (EP, 2018)
 Fegefeuer (Purgatory) (2018)
 Leblos (Lifeless) (2020)
 Bitterböse (Vicious, lit. bitterly evil) (Split, 2021)
 Wiedergänger (Revenant) (EP, 2022)
 Grenzgänger (Border crosser) (2023)

Side projects 
Ronny Fimmel founded a gothic metal band called Ewigheim in 1999 (Michael Roth and Theresa Trenks were featured as session musicians). Michael Roth and Michael Lenz play in a melodic death metal band called Eisblut since 2004, and Ronny Fimmel and Theresa Trenks founded Transilvanian Beat Club in 2005.

References

External links 

 Official website
 
 

German death metal musical groups
German black metal musical groups
Musical groups established in 1995